Khémisti is a district in Tissemsilt Province, Algeria. It was named after its capital, Khémisti.

Municipalities
The district is further divided into 2 municipalities:
Khémisti
Laâyoune

Districts of Tissemsilt Province